Aaron Thomas Wilbraham (born 21 October 1979) is an English football manager and former professional footballer who played as a forward. He is currently assistant manager of  side Shrewsbury Town.

Playing career

Early career
Born in Knutsford, Cheshire, Wilbraham started his career at Stockport County, scoring his first goal in a 4-1 loss to Manchester City in 1997. Altogether, he made 172 league appearances for the club. During that time he also went out on loan to Norwegian club Moss FK. He then signed for Hull City for £100,000 and played his part in winning promotion to the championship. During that time he also had a month on loan at Oldham Athletic in November 2004. In the summer of 2005 he was snapped up by MK Dons.

Milton Keynes Dons
In the 2005–06 season, he was loaned out to Bradford City for two months, scoring once against Oldham Athletic. From the 2006–07 season, Wilbraham became a first team regular for the Dons. In January 2007 he was rewarded for his performances earlier in the season with a new contract until 2009. Wilbraham helped the MK Dons to win the 2007–08 Football League Two title by scoring seven goals in their last 11 matches. He was also a member of the Dons team that won the 2007–08 Football League Trophy. He scored a hat-trick in a 5–3 victory against Cheltenham Town, whose own striker Damian Spencer also scored three goals. In the 2008–09 season under Roberto Di Matteo, he scored 17 goals. He scored his 50th and 51st goal in the 3–3 draw against Brentford on 13 March 2010.

Norwich City
On 30 December 2010, it was announced he was to join Norwich City on 1 January 2011 for an undisclosed fee on an 18-month deal. He would join the club on loan to enable him to play the match versus Queens Park Rangers before making the deal permanent later that day. He made his debut in the 1–0 victory over QPR. He opened his account against Leicester City in a 3–2 win on 8 March 2011. The same season Norwich clinched promotion to the Premier League, meaning Wilbraham had won promotion from all three divisions of the Football League.

Wilbraham made his Premier League debut at Goodison Park, coming on as a substitute for Steve Morison in a 1–1 draw against Everton. He had been an unused substitute for the majority of the season. He scored his 100th career goal as a substitute against Fulham – his first Premier League goal. This goal meant Wilbraham had scored in all four levels of English league football. He made his first Premier League start on 9 April 2012 in a 2–1 win at Tottenham Hotspur.

Crystal Palace

On 4 July 2012, Wilbraham signed a 2-year deal with Crystal Palace on a free transfer. On 28 August 2012, Wilbraham scored his first goal for Palace in a 4–1 defeat to Preston North End in the League Cup.

Wilbraham was involved in the promotion of two teams in a three-year period – automatically with Norwich in the 2010–11 season and via the playoffs with Crystal Palace. He was involved for the full 120 minutes of Palace's playoff final appearance. Wilbraham scored his second goal for Crystal Palace in a 2–1 away loss against Wigan in the FA Cup. He was released by Palace at the end of the 2013–14 season.

Bristol City

It was announced on 2 July 2014 that Wilbraham had signed for Bristol City on a one-year contract. Wilbraham scored one goal and set up another on his competitive debut for the club against Sheffield United in a 2–1 win on the opening day of the season at Bramall Lane. On his home debut, he scored twice against Colchester United in another 2–1 victory, making it three goals from his first two games. Wilbraham continued his impressive form with 2 goals in wins over Notts County and Doncaster, as well as a brace in a 3–0 win over Port Vale, taking his goal tally to 7 from 8 league games. Wilbraham eventually registered the highest goalscoring season of his career, notching 21 goals in all competitions as his side clinched promotion to the Football League Championship.

Bolton Wanderers

On 3 August 2017 Bolton Wanderers confirmed that Wilbraham had joined them for an undisclosed fee, signing a one-year contract. He scored his first goal for Bolton when coming on as a substitute for Jon Flanagan in a 1–1 draw with Sheffield Wednesday at Hillsborough on 10 March 2018. His second goal for Bolton was the winner in a 3–2 victory over Nottingham Forest on 6 May 2018 – a result which helped to keep the Trotters in the EFL Championship. He was released by Bolton at the end of the 2017–18 season.

Rochdale

On 25 June 2018, Rochdale announced the signing of Wilbraham for the 2018–19 season. He was offered a new contract by the club at the end of the 2018–19 season and on 28 June 2019, Wilbraham signed a new one-year contract.

Coaching career
On 2 December 2020, Wilbraham joined Steve Cotterill's coaching staff at League One side Shrewsbury Town, joining as assistant manager.

On 19 January 2021, Wilbraham took charge as stand-in manager for an FA Cup third round tie away at Premier League side Southampton as Cotterill was suffering from COVID-19. Shrewsbury lost the tie 2–0. Wilbraham also took charge on 23 January, a 1–0 league defeat away at Sunderland.

Career statistics

Honours
Bristol City
Football League One: 2014–15
Football League Trophy: 2014–15

Crystal Palace
Football League Championship play-offs: 2013

Hull City
Football League One second-place promotion: 2004–05

Milton Keynes Dons
Football League Two: 2007–08
Football League Trophy: 2007–08

Norwich City
Football League Championship second-place promotion: 2010–11

Individual
Milton Keynes Dons Player of the Year: 2008–09

References

External links

1979 births
Living people
People from Knutsford
Sportspeople from Cheshire
English footballers
Association football forwards
Bradford City A.F.C. players
Hull City A.F.C. players
Milton Keynes Dons F.C. players
Norwich City F.C. players
Oldham Athletic A.F.C. players
Stockport County F.C. players
Moss FK players
Crystal Palace F.C. players
Bristol City F.C. players
Bolton Wanderers F.C. players
English Football League players
Premier League players
English expatriate footballers
Expatriate footballers in Norway
English expatriate sportspeople in Norway
Rochdale A.F.C. players
Eliteserien players
Shrewsbury Town F.C. non-playing staff